Trachycephalus heloi is a frog in the family Hylidae. Scientists have only seen it in one place, in Brazil.

References

Frogs of South America
Trachycephalus